Sihong County is under the administration of Suqian, Jiangsu province, China. It borders the prefecture-level cities of Huai'an to the southeast, Chuzhou (Anhui) to the south, Bengbu (Anhui) to the west, and Suzhou (Anhui) to the northwest.

History 
The area that later became Sihong County probably served as center for the state of Xu during Spring and Autumn period, and harbored its capital city.

Administrative divisions
In the present, Sihong County has 14 towns and 9 townships.
14 towns

9 townships

Climate

See also
Wangtan, a village in Jieji, Sihong County. It is the most beautiful village in Sihong

References

Works cited

External links 
www.xzqh.org 

County-level divisions of Jiangsu
Suqian